Hans Benno Larsen (born 30 September 1949) is a Danish footballer who played as a goalkeeper. He made 16 appearances for the Denmark national team from 1974 to 1977.

References

External links
 
 
 

1949 births
Living people
People from Kolding
Danish men's footballers
Association football goalkeepers
Denmark international footballers
Denmark under-21 international footballers
Denmark youth international footballers
Superettan players
2. Bundesliga players
Boldklubben 1903 players
GAIS players
FC St. Pauli players
Holbæk B&I players
FC Augsburg players
Akademisk Boldklub players
Danish expatriate men's footballers
Danish expatriate sportspeople in Sweden
Expatriate footballers in Sweden
Danish expatriate sportspeople in Germany
Expatriate footballers in Germany
Sportspeople from the Region of Southern Denmark